George Legge may refer to:
George Legge, 1st Baron Dartmouth (c. 1647–1691), Admiral of the Fleet and Master-General of the Ordnance
George Legge, Viscount Lewisham (c. 1703–1732), heir apparent of William Legge, 1st Earl of Dartmouth
George Legge, 3rd Earl of Dartmouth (1755–1810), British politician
George Legge (footballer) (1886–1915), Scottish footballer